Teplice District is a district in the Ústí nad Labem Region of the Czech Republic. Its capital is the city of Teplice.

Administrative division
Teplice District is divided into two administrative districts of municipalities with extended competence: Teplice and Bílina.

List of municipalities
Cities and towns are marked in bold and market towns in italics:

Bílina -
Bořislav -
Bystřany -
Bžany -
Dubí -
Duchcov -
Háj u Duchcova -
Hostomice -
Hrob -
Hrobčice -
Jeníkov -
Kladruby -
Košťany -
Kostomlaty pod Milešovkou -
Krupka -
Lahošť -
Ledvice -
Lukov -
Měrunice -
Mikulov -
Modlany -
Moldava -
Novosedlice -
Ohníč -
Osek -
Proboštov -
Rtyně nad Bílinou -
Srbice -
Světec -
Teplice -
Újezdeček -
Zabrušany -
Žalany -
Žim

Geography

Teplice District borders Germany in the north. The terrain is very varied – hilly in the south, rather flat in the centre, and mountainous in the north. The territory extends into three geomorphological mesoregions: Central Bohemian Uplands (most of the territory), Most Basin (a strip across the territory from west to east) and Ore Mountains (north).

The most important river is the Bílina, which flows across the territory from west to east. There are several reservoirs and artificial lakes created by flooding mines.

České Středohoří is a protected landscape area that extends into the district.

Demographics

Most populated municipalities

Economy
The largest employers with its headquarters in Teplice District and at least 500 employers are:

Transport
There are no motorways in the district territory. The most important road that passess through the district is the I/13 from Karlovy Vary to Liberec.

Sights

The mining cultural landscape of Krupka was designated a UNESCO World Heritage Site in 2019 as part of the transnational Ore Mountain Mining Region.

The most important monuments in the district, protected as national cultural monuments, are:
Memorial to the victims of the Nelson Mine disaster in Osek
Cistercian monastery in Osek
Duchcov Castle
Basilica of Our Lady of Sorrows in Krupka-Bohosudov

The best-preserved settlements, localities and landscapes, protected as monument reservations and monument zones, are:
Bílina-Pražské Předměstí (archeological monument reservation)
Bílina
Duchcov
Krupka
Teplice
Mining cultural landscape of Krupka

The most visited tourist destination is the Regional Museum in Teplice.

References

External links

Teplice District profile on the Czech Statistical Office's website

 
Districts of the Czech Republic